Ademir Ueta, more commonly known by his nickname China, (born 3 October 1948) is a Brazilian former professional footballer. He competed in the men's tournament at the 1968 Summer Olympics. China played for various clubs including Palmeiras, Clube Náutico Capibaribe. Guarani and Marítimo, where he scored 21 goals in 63 games.

References

External links
 

1948 births
Living people
Brazilian footballers
Brazil international footballers
Olympic footballers of Brazil
C.S. Marítimo players
Footballers at the 1968 Summer Olympics
Footballers from São Paulo
Association football midfielders
Sociedade Esportiva Palmeiras players